The Nobel Peace Prize for Article 9 of the Japanese Constitution (憲法9条にノーベル平和賞を) is a social movement whose aim is to push for the Nobel Peace Prize to be awarded to the citizens of Japan for maintaining the country's post-war Constitution, especially Article 9.

History
The movement began with an undertaking by a member of the group's Executive Committee. The Executive Committee received endorsements from influential Japanese and gathered signatures from across the world. On April 9, 2014, they received a letter from the Norwegian Nobel Committee that the committee had received the recommendation. On May 22, 2014, Hiroyuki Konishi, Yoshiko Kira and other Members of the Parliament (Diet) of Japan announced that they had submitted the recommendation via the Norwegian Embassy. The supportive 60 Diet lawmakers came from seven government parties, as well as opposition parties, indicating its cross-bench appeal.

On February 21, 2015, the Kobe branch's Executive Committee announced that they had submitted a similar recommendation, selecting political groups concerned with protecting the Peace Constitution.

2014–15
PRIO listed the movement as one of the leading candidates for the Nobel Peace Prize in 2014. The Nobel committee spokesperson said that it was not possible for the citizens of an entire nation to be awarded the prize. Therefore, the application was rejected.

Kristian Berg Harpviken, director of the Peace Research Institute Oslo was concerned that Shinzō Abe, Prime Minister of Japan, was trying to reinterpret Article 9 and that this could be a  precursor of armed confrontation.

Korea
Peace Research Institute Oslo included Kyūjyō no kai as one of the leading candidates (fourth place) for 2015 prize.

In South Korea, many people engaged in supportive activities and collected signatures. A total of 142 lawmakers, former Presidents and intellectuals supported the movement. In Korea itself, there is fierce competition for the Nobel Prize, indeed it is rare for Koreans to support the candidacy of foreigners, especially Japanese, for the Nobel Peace Prize. On December 9, 2014, Gangwon Province (강원도, 江原道), a local government of South Korea, decided to award the "Korean DMZ Peace Prize" to the group.

Criticism
Conservatives, including , a Japanese journalist, claimed that a hidden motive behind the movement is to prevent amendments to the Japanese Constitution by anti-Japanese foreign powers as well as domestic anti-government forces.

For this reason, according to him, the statement that the Japanese Constitution is the world's only pacifist constitution is incorrect. He also claims that articles that renounce war as a sovereign right of the nation as means of settling international disputes are explicitly stated in the constitutions of Italy and Azerbaijan.

See also
Article 9 of the Japanese Constitution
Japanese people who conserve Article 9

References

Further reading
鷹巣直美「新 わたしと憲法シリーズ 鷹巣直美 「憲法9条」にノーベル平和賞を 署名を送り続ける2児のママ」『金曜日』22(3):53, 2014-01-24  
「憲法9条にノーベル平和賞を」実行委員会 2014 「憲法九条を世界にアピールし、戦争の抑止力に」 『ヒューマンライツ』 317:18-21

External links

Constitutions of Japan
Japanese anti-war activists
Nobel Peace Prize
Norwegian awards
Peace organizations based in Japan
Protests in Japan
Social movements in Japan